The General Motors Hour was an Australian radio and television drama series.

Radio
The radio series was a regular one hour drama broadcast over the Macquarie Radio Network at 8 pm on Thursays. It is believed to have commenced in the late 1940s and lasted into the early 1960s. Producers included Robert Peach and Harry Dearth. The announcer was John Dease. 15 episodes are available on the Old Time Radio website.

Television
The television version of The General Motors Hour was a loosely scheduled occasional series which aired on Australian television from 1960 to 1962. The series aired on ATN-7 in Sydney and GTV-9 in Melbourne, as well as on other affiliated stations across Australia. The presentations ranged from adaptations of overseas stage plays and anthology episodes, to locally-written drama and a documentary.

Its first show was a production of The Grey Nurse Said Nothing.

Three of the TV episodes - Suspect, Candida, and Shadow Of The Vine - had been produced by English producer Peter Cotes for HSV-7 in 1961, but were shelved due to lack of sponsorship. Sponsorship was provided by GM-H in 1962, and plays were run on HSV-7 and TCN-9 under the "General Motors Hour" title.

List of known TV episodes
The Grey Nurse Said Nothing (1960, drama)
This is Television (1960, variety, documentary)
Thunder on Sycamore Street (1960, drama)
You, Too, Can Have a Body (1960, drama)
Shadow of a Pale Horse (1960, drama)
The Concert (1961, drama)
Long Distance (1961)
Suspect (1961, drama)
Mystery of a Hansom Cab (1962, melodrama)
The One Day of the Year (1962, drama)
Candida (1961, comedy)
Manhaul (1962, drama)
Shadow of the Vine (1961, drama)

See also
Shell Presents - 1959-1960 occasional series
Killer in Close-Up - 1957-1958 anthology of four half-hour plays on ABC

References

External links
The Grey Nurse Said Nothing on IMDb
Thunder on Sycamore Street on IMDb
Shadow of a Pale Horse on IMDb
The One Day of the Year on IMDb
Candida on IMDb
Manhaul on IMDb

Australian radio dramas
English-language radio programs
1960 Australian television series debuts
1962 Australian television series endings
Australian anthology television series
Black-and-white Australian television shows
English-language television shows